Lakheri railway station is a railway station in Bundi district, Rajasthan. Its code is LKE. It serves Lakheri. The station consists of 3 platforms. Passenger, Express, and Superfast trains halt here.

References

Railway stations in Bundi district
Kota railway division